Castello di Annone is a comune (municipality) in the Province of Asti in the Italian region Piedmont, located about  southeast of Turin and about  east of Asti.

Castello di Annone borders the following municipalities: Asti, Cerro Tanaro, Quattordio, Refrancore, Rocca d'Arazzo, and Rocchetta Tanaro. Its name derives from the Latin ad nonum ("nine miles"), indicating its distance from Asti. In the Middle Ages it was an important strategic hub, until it was destroyed by Spanish troops in 1644. In 1994 it was flooded by the  nearby Tanaro river.

References

External links
 Official website

Cities and towns in Piedmont